Ganiel is a given name and a surname. Notable people with the name include:

Ganiel Krishnan (born 1994), Filipino beauty queen, actress, and sportscaster
Amir Ganiel (1963–2018), Israeli swimmer
Imri Ganiel (born 1992), Israeli swimmer, son of Amir